McKinney Independent School District is a public school district in McKinney, Texas, United States. In addition to McKinney, the district serves the town of New Hope and parts of Allen, Fairview,  Weston,  Princeton,  and Lowry Crossing. The district operates 20 elementary schools, five middle schools, three high schools, four alternative schools, and one early childhood education center.

In 2009, the school district was rated "academically acceptable" by the Texas Education Agency.

History
Circa 2014 residents of the Stonegate neighborhood in Lucas made a petition to be rezoned from McKinney ISD into Lovejoy ISD, but both districts refused the request.

Demographics

Schools

High Schools (Grades 9-12)

McKinney High School
McKinney North High School
McKinney Boyd High School

Middle Schools (Grades 6-8)
Cockrill Middle School 
Dowell Middle School 
Evans Middle School 
Faubion Middle School 
Scott Johnson Middle School

Elementary Schools (Grades PK-5)
Bennett Elementary
Burks Elementary
Caldwell Elementary
C. T. Eddins Elementary School
2007 National Blue Ribbon School
Finch Elementary
Glen Oaks Elementary
2006 National Blue Ribbon School
Reuben Johnson Elementary
Malvern Elementary
McClure Elementary 
McGowen Elementary
McNeil Elementary
Minshew Elementary
Press Elementary
Slaughter Elementary
Valley Creek Elementary
National Blue Ribbon School in 1996-97 and 2003
Vega Elementary
Walker Elementary
Webb Elementary
Wilmeth Elementary
Wolford Elementary
2006 National Blue Ribbon School

Other campuses
McKinney Learning Center
DAEP
Serenity High School (Grades 9-12)
Herman Lawson Early Childhood Center
The John Roach Juvenile Detention Center of Collin County, also known as the County Residential Center (CRC)

Stadium
The district operates the 12,000-seat McKinney ISD Stadium that cost more than $70 million to build. It opened on August 31, 2018. The stadium hosted the 2018, 2019 and 2021 NCAA Division II National Championship football games as well as several UIL state football playoff games, such as Duncanville vs. Rockwall in 2019.

References

External links
 

School districts in Collin County, Texas